Laurier Québec (formerly called and still commonly referred to as Place Laurier) is one of Canada's largest shopping malls. It is located in Quebec City, Quebec (in what was formerly the city of Sainte-Foy).

Though Galeries de la Capitale is the biggest mall in the city in terms of area, Laurier Quebec remains the largest by number of tenants. It has approximately 300 stores and restaurants and is built on three levels with underground, multilevel, and outdoor parking. Major tenants include La Baie d'Hudson, Best Buy, Toys "R" Us, Marshalls and Walmart. Other tenants include jewellery, gift, shoe, book, eyeware, music, toy, electronics, clothing, hardware, and pet stores as well as hair and beauty salons.
 
Four of the original 50 tenants from 1961 are still in the mall: Reitmans, the Laurier Comneuf cordwainer shop, the Doucet jewellery store, and the Laurier dry-cleaner. The mall was noteworthy for having two Zellers stores at the same time in the 1990s and two Dominion supermarkets in the 1960s.

History

1960s
Place Laurier was the first indoor mall in the province of Quebec.  It opened on November 11, 1961, as a two-level mall with 50 stores including anchors Pascal, Syndicat, Kresge's, Towers, Dominion Stores as well as an office building with eight floors known as Tour Frontenac. They were shortly joined by a Paquet store.

In 1964, an expansion occurred in both extremities of Place Laurier.  In the western part, a new mall section of three floors was built on Towers' original anchor space. The first floor of this western expansion constituted of the relocated Towers store, a second Dominion supermarket, and a Marquis de Montcalm restaurant. The second floor was reserved for a relocated Syndicat (which had tripled its size), the first level of a new Norman store as well as a branch of the Bank of Montreal. The third floor was mostly for the second level of Norman. In total, 403,000 square feet was added in this western expansion of three floors. In the eastern side of the mall, Pascal increased its size by 30% in absorbing Paquet's original location. The latter moved in a brand new two-level building  of 131,980 square feet.

1970s
An expansion to the north welcomed a two-level Sears store of 160,000 square feet and a new mall section of 48 boutiques spread on three floors for an additional 100,000 square feet of retail space.  Sears opened in October 1971 under its then-name of Simpsons-Sears and was the chain's  second store in the Quebec City area. The rest of the northern section inaugurated in 1972.

In 1976, Marathon Realty, the real-estate of Canadian Pacific, purchased for $40 million Place Laurier from Les Immeubles Delrano.

1980s

Paquet and Syndicat both declared bankruptcy in 1981. A 80,920 square feet single-level Zellers  opened on November 3, 1982 in one of the two floors of the closed Paquet store. As for Syndicat's vacant space, it was eventually subdivided by anchors Toyville and Wise, a General Motors car dealership and some 10 stores.

An expansion to the south installed on September 15, 1982 a two-level La Baie store and a new mall section of 65 boutiques spread on two floors. 130,000 square feet of retail space was brought by La Baie alone and another 129,534 for the boutiques.

At this point, Place Laurier has undergone nine expansions between 1961 and 1986.

1990s

Pascal went bankrupt in 1991, leaving Toys "R" Us to occupy 40,000 square feet of the vacant space.

Zellers converted Bonimart into its nameplate in 1991 resulting in Place Laurier having two department stores with the same name.  In the summer of 1996, the Zellers on the east side of the mall (previously Paquet) closed and was replaced by boutiques, while Zellers on the west end (formerly Towers/Bonimart) was enlarged to reach 135,000 square feet.

In 1994, Marathon sold half of its stake in Place Laurier to OMERS Realty Corp, the real estate investment arm of Ontario's municipal employees' pension fund. The manager of Place Laurier changed to Oxford Properties on  October 2, 1996 due to the acquisition of Marathon by Olympiad Acquisitions, a company jointly owned by Oxford and GE Capital.

2000s
Ivanhoe, the real estate arm of the Caisse de depot et placement du Quebec became the manager of Place Laurier in May 2000 and also acquired the 50% stake that was owned by Oxford. Ivanhoe merged in 2001 with Cambridge Shopping Centres to become Ivanhoé Cambridge.

2010s

In June 2010, Ivanhoé Cambridge purchased the 50% interest  by OMERS in the property to hold 100% of the ownership.

Another expansion welcomed a Best Buy store in September 2011 on the same day the retailer opened its other location at Galeries de la Capitale.

The Zellers store that was formerly Towers/Bonimart closed on December 17, 2012. Target Canada replaced it on October 18, 2013. Following Target's exit, Walmart Canada acquired the lease and opened its supercenter in 2016.

Marshalls inaugurated on August 25, 2016 in the space vacated by Future Shop.

Sears closed with the rest of the chain on January 14, 2018.

2020s
In late 2021, Sports Experts opened in Sears's former space at 84,000 square foot over two floors.

The two-level 157,000 square foot La Baie d'Hudson store, that was added during the mall's expansion in the early 1980s, is set to close on September 11, 2022, four days short of its 40th anniversary. Like most locations of that retail chain, the name on its storefront had been modified from La Baie to La Baie d'Hudson during the 2010s but it still lacked the renovation that another outlet in nearly Galeries de la Capitale had received. The site will be redeveloped to include residential buildings. The shopping center itself will triple its size from 1.3 to 3.5 million square feet.  Ivanhoe Cambridge will join force with the Quebec group Douville, Moffet et Associés which also bought 50% of the shopping center to carry out the project over 10 years.

Major tenants
Aliments de Santé Laurier
Best Buy
Walmart Canada
Marshalls
Sunrise Records (retailer)
Linen Chest
Old Navy
Renaud-Bray
Sports Experts
La Baie d'Hudson
Toys "R" Us

See also
List of largest enclosed shopping malls in Canada
List of shopping malls in Canada
Galeries de la Capitale
Fleur de Lys centre commercial
Place Sainte-Foy

References

External links

Shopping malls established in 1961
1961 establishments in Quebec
Shopping malls in Quebec City
Ivanhoé Cambridge